Broadway Historic District is a nationally recognized historic district and neighborhood in Rock Island, Illinois, United States. It is roughly bounded by 17th and 23rd street, 5th and 7th avenues, Lincoln Court, and 12th and 13th avenues. Containing more than 550 Victorian homes as well as other buildings, it known for its Great Unveiling program, which encourages the removal of artificial siding from historic houses.

On August 14, 1998, it was added to the National Register of Historic Places.

Contributing properties
Contributing properties in the district include:
Connor House
First Church of Christ, Scientist
Lincoln School
Potter House
Robert Wagner House

References

External links
 Broadway Historic District Association website
 The Broadway Historic District Qctimes.tv 12 minute video
 

Historic districts on the National Register of Historic Places in Illinois
Buildings and structures in Rock Island, Illinois
Queen Anne architecture in Illinois
Colonial Revival architecture in Illinois
Italianate architecture in Illinois
National Register of Historic Places in Rock Island County, Illinois
Rock Island Landmark